KTIC (840 AM) is a radio station broadcasting a country music format. Like its sister music station KTIC-FM, it is licensed to West Point, Nebraska, United States. The station serves eastern Nebraska and the Sioux City area.  The station is currently owned by the Nebraska Rural Radio Association and features programming from ABC Radio.

The main focus of KTIC is to provide area farmers with the most current market information from the Rural Radio Network. Futures Updates and Ag News plays every hour during the trading day at 10 and 40 minutes past each hour. News and weather updates come at the bottom of each hour with ABC news as well as more regionally centered news being the main focus. Many agricultural organizations in the area have programming slots on KTIC to accommodate the interests of the farmers and ranchers in the area. Two low-powered translators at 98.3 FM in West Point and 98.7 FM in Norfolk simulcast KTIC's programming.

KTIC must shut down its main AM transmitter at night in order to protect clear-channel WHAS in Louisville, which is also located on AM 840. As such, its operating hours vary depending on the time of year. However, the translators remain on the air 24 hours a day.

References

External links

TIC (AM)
TIC (AM)
Radio stations established in 1985
1985 establishments in Nebraska